Mahjabeen Khaled (born 16 December 1966) is a Bangladeshi politician from the Bangladesh Awami League party. She is Member of Parliament (MP) in the Jatiya Sangsad from her ancestral area of Islampur Upazila in Jamalpur District of Mymensingh Division. Her constituency is Seat no. 18. She is also a member of the Parliamentary Standing Committee on Foreign Affairs. She is the daughter of Major General Khaled Mosharraf.

Early life
Mahjabeen Khaled was born on 16 December 1966 in Dhaka. Her father, Major General Khaled Musharraf, was the Sector Commander of the Mukti Bahini's Sector 2 and the Commander-in-Chief of the K Force. Later he became the Chief of General Staff (CGS) of the Bangladesh Army.

Education 
Mahjabin Khaled passed Secondary School Certificate (SSC) from Holy Cross School and College. She studied at Loreto College, Darjeeling. Later did BA (Hons).

Career
As a member of the Bangladesh Awami League, Mahjabin Khaled is now a Member of Parliament. As a member of the Parliamentary Standing Committee for Foreign Affairs, she has toured various countries with a delegation of delegates to enhance the country's diplomatic communication skills. Mahzabin is also working to raise global awareness on the liberation war and war crimes in Bangladesh. Child Rights has played a role in the Caucus and Climate Parliament as part of the Bangladeshi delegates to the UN General Assembly.

Earlier in her career, she has been active in various development agencies and has been vocal on contemporary issues of national interest, human rights, rule of law, interfaith issues, peace, economy and the rights of people with disabilities.

Her Father Khaled mosharraf was killed on November 7, 1975 the commander of Sector 2 and the commander of K Force. She is the eldest daughter of him.

References

Living people
1966 births
People from Jamalpur District
10th Jatiya Sangsad members
Women members of the Jatiya Sangsad
21st-century Bangladeshi women politicians